Benton Whitley (born February 12, 1999) is an American football outside linebacker for the Minnesota Vikings of the National Football League (NFL). He played college football at Holy Cross.

College career
Whitley played for the Holy Cross Crusaders for five seasons. He became a starter as a junior and used the extra year of eligibility granted to college athletes in 2020 due to the COVID-19 pandemic and returned to Holy Cross for a fifth season. Whitley finished his college career with 111 tackles, 26.5 tackles for loss, and 15.5 sacks in 42 games played.

Professional career

Los Angeles Rams
Whitley signed with the Los Angeles Rams as an undrafted free agent on April 30, 2022. He was waived on August 30, 2022, and signed to the practice squad the next day.

Kansas City Chiefs
The Kansas City Chiefs signed Whitley off the Rams' practice squad to their active roster on September 21, 2022. He was waived on October 12, 2022. He was signed to the Chiefs' practice squad two days later.

Minnesota Vikings
On October 19, 2022, the Minnesota Vikings signed Whitley off the Kansas City Chiefs practice squad. He was waived on November 19, 2022, and re-signed to the practice squad two days later. He signed a reserve/future contract on January 16, 2023.
Twin

References

External links
Minnesota Vikings bio
Holy Cross Crusaders bio

1999 births
Living people
Players of American football from Massachusetts
Sportspeople from Springfield, Massachusetts
American football defensive ends
Holy Cross Crusaders football players
Los Angeles Rams players
Kansas City Chiefs players
Minnesota Vikings players